Musiqq is a Latvian pop music duo from Liepāja formed by Marats Ogļezņevs and Emīls Balceris. The duo first gained exposure in June 2009 with the release of their first single “Klimata kontrole”("Climate control"), but on October 1 their second single "Abrakadabra" came out, which was a radio hit in Latvia and "SEB Musical Bank 2009" winner. Their debut album "Šī ir tikai mūzika"("This is just music") was released in March 2010, which included radio hits such as "Abrakadabra", "Dzimšanas diena" ("Birthday") and "Klimata kontrole" ("Climate control"). Both singers were awarded as "Gada Liepājnieks"("Liepajnieks of the year" is a prize awarded for those, who have invested their time, effort and talent into making the city a better place) in nomination "'Music" and received three Copyright infinity prizes, because their songs are the most played on the radio, television and concerts. Musiqq represented Latvia in 2011 Eurovision Song Contest Düsseldorf with the song "Angel in Disguise". 

They are also known as Latvian rap duo called "Bermudu Divstūris", which formed in 2011. The name of the rap duo is a play on Bermuda Triangle, the literal translation being "The Bermuda Digon". As "Bermudu Divstūris" the band has released three studio albums and in 2014 it received The Golden Microphine award as "Best hip-hop or dance album".

History

2009: Formation 
Musiqq formed in 2009, when founding member Marats Ogļezņevs left his previous group "Device" and invited Emīls Balceris to a meeting. The singers had previously met by participating in the TV show "Koru kari" ("Choir Wars") in 2008, where Emīls Balceris and Marats Ogļezņevs  sang together in Liepājas red choir, led by singer Chilli. In the same year, Marats Ogļezņevs saw Emīls Balceris perform in the youth broadcast "SeMS" and decided to write him a letter with an invitation to meet and work together. At group's first meeting, they wrote four demo versions of songs.

2010: Šī ir tikai mūzika
Musiqq released their debut album, "Šī ir tikai mūzika"("This is just a music"), on 24 March 2010, which was recorded at MicRec recording company in cooperation with the producer Jānis Kalve. Four singles were released from "Šī ir tikai mūzika"("This is just a music"), including their first single "Klimata kontrole"("Climate control") and "Abrakadabra", which won the main prize of the pop music survey "Musical Bank". Other singles from the album were "Pirmā manā Ziemassvētku sarakstā"("The first on my Christmas list"), which was Christmas themed, and the hit "Dzimšanas diena"("Birthday"), which reached number 3 in "SEB Musical Bank 2010".

2014: Vēl viena mūzika
After the success of "Šī ir tikai mūzika"("This is just a music"), Musiqq returned to the studio to begin work on their second album, "Vēl viena mūzika"("Another music"), continuing to collaborate with the producer Jānis Kalve. The album was released in November 2014, celebrating the 5th birthday of the group, and spawned several popular singles including "Sekundes"("Seconds"), "Cтрана без называния"("Country without name"), performed with musician Giacomo and "Angel in Disguise", which had already competed in the 2011 Eurovision Song Contest selection. To date the largest Musiqq live performance has been their fifth birthday concert in a concert hall Palladium in Riga on November 16, 2014, in which they revealed album "Vēl viena mūzika"("Another music").

2015: Silta sirds
Musiqq album "Silta sirds"("Warm heart") is their first acoustic album made in collaboration with group "DaGamba", pop group "DoReMi", guitarist Uldis Beitiņš, bass guitarist Viktors Veselovs and saxophonist Alex Han. The album got his name from the lead single, also called "Silta sirds"("Warm heart"). The members of the group are very excited about this album idea being realized, because they started thinking about an acoustic album a while ago, and its title "Warm Heart" shows album emotional impression.

In this time Musiqq announced their first acoustic concert tour "Silta sirds" and they visited five cities in Latvia – Valmiera, Rīga, Rēzekne, Liepāja and Jelgava. Members of Musiqq performed together with the guitarist Uldis Beitiņš, bass Roberts Rasa, pianist, guitarist Edgars Jass, Viktors Veselovs (percussion), saxophonist Alex Han and back vocal - Rūta Dūduma to create an acoustic sound.

2019: 10
Musiqq latest album "10" has been released in honor of the band's 10th anniversary. The album was a release of 10 tracks of which the best known are "Biļete tikai uz priekšu", "Sāc ar sevi", "Tētis var visu", "Bozies" and "Salas". On April 27, 2019 the band also held a concert in "Arena Riga" dedicated to its 10th anniversary, which was the most grandiose concert the band has ever had in its 10 years.

Musical style
Musiqq's musical style has generally been regarded in pop and R&B style. The author of the lyrics and music is Marats Ogļezņevs. They arranges and produces their own songs by themselves in three different languages - Latvian, English and Russian.

Band members

 Emīls Balceris – lead vocals  
 Marats Ogļezņevs - lead vocals, music and lyrics author

Discography 
 "Šī ir tikai mūzika"(2010)
 "Vēl viena mūzika" (2014) 
 "Silta Sirds" (2015)
 "10" (2019)

Awards and nominations
Since 2009, Musiqq's songs have regularly been considered as some of the highest selling in Latvia, and their songs are often played on the radio, television and concerts, which confirms three Copyright infinity prizes, which receives author, whose works have been used the most in different ways. The band also received the award "Gada Liepājnieks" ("Liepajnieks of the year" is a prize awarded for those, who have invested their time, effort and talent into making the city a better place) in nomination "Music" in 2010.

Musiqq contributions to music have also received recognition with "Abrakadabra" consistently being ranked as the most "valuable" song in the Latvian Radio 2 pop and rock song survey "SEB Musical Bank 2009'' and the next year they got third place with the song "Dzimšanas diena"("Birthday") from their debut album. In 2011, the band participated in the TV song contest "Eirodziesmas 2011" ("Eurosongs 2011") final with the song "Angel in Disguise", and won the opportunity to represent Latvia in the international Eurovision Song Contest in Germany, where they ranked number 17 in the second semifinal. In 2015,  Musiqq  won three nominations in the record of the year prize "Zelta Mikrofons 2014"("Golden Microphone 2014") - "Labākais pop albums"("Best pop album"), "Labakā dziesma"("The best song") and "Alfas gada dziesma" ("Alpha song of the year") with the song "Sekundes"("Seconds") from their second album. The band was ranked in "SEB Musical bank" top 15 for many years, and in 2017, the song “Debesis iekrita tevī” ("The sky is falling on you"), which they wrote and performed with fellow Latvian music group Prāta vētra (Brainstorm), ranked first place as the most ''valuable'' song, and won the record of the year prize "Zelta Mikrofons 2017" ("Golden Microphone 2017") in the category "Labākā dziesma" ("The best song").

References

External links 
Musiqq on Myspace

Eurovision Song Contest entrants for Latvia
Eurovision Song Contest entrants of 2011
Latvian pop music groups
Musical groups established in 2009